Laurie Andrea Wayburn (born September 27, 1954) is an American author and conservationist. She was born to Peggy Wayburn and Edgar Wayburn on September 28, 1954. She transferred to Harvard University after a year at the University of California, Davis, and later graduated from Harvard University. She was the executive director of Point Reyes Bird Observatory from 1987 to 1992. She is the president and co-founder of Pacific Forest Trust. She received a James Irvine Foundation Leadership Award and a Kingsbury Browne Conservation Leadership Award in 2008.

Bibliography

References

Living people
1954 births
American conservationists
Harvard University alumni